Pine Labs is an Indian company that provides financing and retail transaction technology. Founded in 1998, it is a unicorn startup, with a valuation of over US$5 billion.

It makes software for point of sale (PoS) machines. The company has more than 70,000 retailers across India, including major retail outlets such as Mark's and Spencer's Retail, Pantaloons, Shoppers Stop and Westside. It has a presence in India, Malaysia and other parts of Asia.

In January 2022, Pine Labs filed confidentially for an initial public offering (IPO) with the U.S. Securities and Exchange Commission  seeking to raise about $500 million later this year, giving it a valuation of $5.57 billion.

Some of its investors include LonePine, PayPal, Temasek, Actis Capital, Altimeter Capital, Sofina and Sequoia Capital.

History  
The company was founded in 1998. The company evolved from petroleum retail automation to becoming a payments products and services firm for merchants. It has over 100,000 merchants in India and other Asian countries. Pine Labs has sold over 850,000 PoS terminals in India.

In 2004, Pine Labs ventured into mainstream payments and financial offerings for merchants.

The company acquired a gifting startup Qwikcilver for $110 million in March 2019.

In February 2019, the company partnered with RAKBANK to launch a payment platform in the UAE. In March 2018, Google Pay came into partnership with Pine Labs to capture the offline payments space in India. The company was partnered with UnionPay in January 2019.

In April 2021, Pine Labs acquired Southeast Asian deals and cash-back platform Fave for $45 million. Fave's co-founders Joel Neoh, Yeoh Chen Chow, and Arzumy MD will continue working in the company to expand its presence across Southeast Asia and India.

In August, 2021 the company suffered a data breach exposing the data of up to 500,000 of its users to hackers.

Financial and Funding

Funding 
In May 2018, Pine Labs raised $125 million (₹843 crores) from Temasek Holdings and PayPal, making it one of the unicorn startup companies with a valuation of over $1 billion.

In March 2018, the company raised $82 million (₹530 crores) from Actis Capital, a private equity fund and Altimeter Capital, a California-based investment company. It had also raised funds in 2015 from Sofina and in 2009 from Sequoia Capital. As of May 2018, It has raised a total of $208 million.

In May 2019, it was listed among the top 10 highest-funded startups in India by CNBC TV18. In Jan 2020, it  announced it had raised an undisclosed sum from Mastercard . In December 2020, it raised US$75-$100 million led by US based billionaire Stephen Mandel's hedge fund Lone Pine Capital. After this funding Pine Labs valuation increased to more than US$2 billion. In July 2021, it raised $325 million at a valuation of $3.5 billion from Fidelity and Blackrock.

Products and services 
The company provides mobile devices that allow merchants to accept credit and debit card payments.

See also 

 List of unicorn startup companies

References 

List of Top 10 Fintech Companies In India 2022-23 by CEO Review Magazine

Companies based in Noida
Companies established in 1998
Technology companies of India
Indian companies established in 1998
Payment service providers
Privately held companies of India
Online payments
Mobile payments in India
1998 establishments in Uttar Pradesh
Cybercrime in India